The Tyranni (suboscines) are a suborder of passerine birds that includes more than 1,000 species, the large majority of which are South American. It is named after the type genus Tyrannus.

These have a different anatomy of the syrinx musculature than the oscines (songbirds of the larger suborder Passeri), hence the common name of suboscines. The available morphological, DNA sequence, and biogeographical data, as well as the (scant) fossil record, agree that these two major passerine suborders are evolutionarily distinct clades.

Systematics
The suborder Tyranni is divided into two infraorders: the Eurylaimides and the Tyrannides. The New Zealand wrens in the family Acanthisittidae are placed in a separate suborder Acanthisitti.

The phylogenetic relationships of the 16 families in the Tyranni suborder is shown below. The cladogram is based on a large molecular genetic study by Carl Oliveros and collaborators published in 2019: The families and the species numbers are from the list maintained by the International Ornithologists' Union (IOC).

The Eurylaimides contain the Old World suboscines – mainly distributed in tropical regions around the Indian Ocean – and a single American species, the sapayoa:
 Philepittidae: asities
 Eurylaimidae: typical broadbills
 Calyptomenidae: African and green broadbills
 Sapayoidae: broad-billed sapayoa
 Pittidae: pittas
  
The Tyrannides contain all the suboscines from the Americas except the broad-billed sapayoa. The families listed here are those recognised by the International Ornithologists' Union.
 Pipridae: manakins
 Cotingidae: cotingas
 Tityridae: tityras, sharpbill, becards (includes Oxyruncus and Onychorhynchus)
 Tyrannidae: tyrant-flycatchers (includes Piprites, Platyrinchus, Tachuris and Rhynchocyclus)
 Melanopareiidae: crescent chests
 Conopophagidae: gnateaters and gnatpittas
 Thamnophilidae: antbirds
 Grallariidae: antpittas
 Rhinocryptidae: tapaculos
 Formicariidae: antthrushes
 Furnariidae: ovenbirds and woodcreepers (includes Dendrocolaptidae)

This group has been separated into three parvorders by Sibley & Ahlquist. However, DNA:DNA hybridization did not reliably resolve the suboscine phylogeny. It was eventually determined that there was a simple dichotomy between the antbirds and allies (tracheophones), and the tyrant-flycatchers and allies. Given that the "parvorder" arrangement originally advanced is obsolete (see e.g. Irestedt et al. 2002 for tracheophone phylogeny) — more so if the Eurylaimides are elevated to a distinct suborder — it is better to rank the clades as superfamilies or, if the broadbill group is considered a separate suborder, as infraorders. In the former case, the name Furnarioidea would be available for the tracheophones, whereas "Tyrannoidea", the "bronchophone" equivalent, has not yet been formally defined.
In the latter case, the tracheophones would be classified as "Furnariides",
while the Tyrannides would be restricted to the tyrant-flycatchers and other "bronchophone" families.

The tracheophones contain the Furnariidae, Thamnophilidae, Formicariidae (probably including most tapaculos), and Conopophagidae. The tyrant-flycatcher clade includes the namesake family, the Tityridae, the Cotingidae, and the Pipridae.

References

Further reading

Irestedt, Martin; Fjeldså, Jon; Johansson, Ulf S. & Ericson, Per G.P. (2002): Systematic relationships and biogeography of the tracheophone suboscines (Aves: Passeriformes). Molecular Phylogenetics and Evolution 23(3): 499–512.  (HTML abstract)

 
Bird suborders
Extant Eocene first appearances